Dr Rabinder Buttar  is the founder, CEO & Chair Person of a clinical research organisation.

Academia 

Dr Buttar holds a BSc in Biochemistry from the University of Glasgow and a PhD in Immunology from the University of Strathclyde. as well as a certificate in Management from Reading, and received an honorary doctorate from the University of the West of Scotland. She served for four years on the board of the Institute of Clinical Research UK (ICR), is an Honorary Fellow of ICR, a Fellow of the Royal Society of Medicine, a Fellow of the Royal Society of Medicine and, in 2014, she became a Fellow of the Royal Society of Edinburgh.

Awards 

In 2009, Dr Rabinder Buttar was named the Institute of Directors, 'Director of the Year' for Glasgow & West of Scotland, and in 2010, she received the Ernst & Young Scottish Entrepreneur of the Year award

External links 
Science council 100 leading UK practising scientists

References 

Living people
Women biochemists
British biochemists
British immunologists
Year of birth missing (living people)
Alumni of the University of Glasgow
Place of birth missing (living people)
Alumni of the University of Strathclyde